William Sidney Shacklette (May 18, 1880 - February 12, 1945) was a hospital steward serving in the United States Navy who received the Medal of Honor for bravery.

Biography
Shacklette was born May 18, 1880, in Delaplane, Virginia and when he was twenty-two years old he joined the United States Navy. He enlisted for four years as a Hospital Apprentice First Class at the U.S. Naval Rendezvous at the Washington Navy Yard in Washington, D.C.  He served on two other ships before being transferred to the gunboat . Although he suffered severe third degree burns over much of his body in the explosion he assisted other wounded as much as he could and was credited with saving the lives of many of his fellow sailors. For his actions received the Medal January 5, 1906. Due to his injuries he was honorably discharged from the Navy from the sailors quarters at the Washington Navy Yard October 23, 1906.

After recovering from his wounds he completed seminary school and returned to active duty in the United States Army during World War I as a chaplain. He remained on active duty through the war and once it was over continued as a minister which eventually led to his nomination to be the Chaplain of the United States Senate.
 
He died February 12, 1945, and was buried in Arlington National Cemetery Arlington, Virginia seven days later on February 19, 1945. His grave can be found in section 10, lot 10688.

Honors
Shacklette Hall, a barracks located at Portsmouth Naval Medical Center was named for him on June 13, 1996.

Medal of Honor citation
Rank and organization: Hospital Steward, U.S. Navy. Born: 17 May 1880, Delaplane, Va. Accredited to: Virginia. G.O. No.: 13, 5 January 1906.

Citation:

For extraordinary heroism while serving on the U.S.S. Bennington at the time of the explosion of a boiler of that vessel at San Diego, Calif., 21 July 1905.

See also

List of Medal of Honor recipients in non-combat incidents

References

External links

1880 births
1945 deaths
United States Navy Medal of Honor recipients
United States Navy sailors
United States Army officers
People from Virginia
Burials at Arlington National Cemetery
United States Army personnel of World War I
World War I chaplains
Non-combat recipients of the Medal of Honor